Metrosideros elegans is a species of plant endemic to New Caledonia in the family Myrtaceae. The tree has yellow flowers and grows most commonly between about 300 and 1,500 metres altitude in forest or shrubland. It is sometimes epiphyte at first.

Cultivars
There are no known cultivars of M. elegans available, and the plant is not widely available in plant nurseries.

References

elegans
Flora of New Caledonia
Plants described in 1901